Jack Kelly (born 1996) is a hurler who plays for Laois Senior Championship club Rathdowney–Errill and at inter-county level with the Laois senior hurling team. He usually lines out as a right wing-back.

Honours

Laois
Joe McDonagh Cup (1): 2019

References

External links
Jack Kelly profile at the Laois GAA website

1996 births
Living people
Rathdowney-Errill hurlers
Laois inter-county hurlers
Hurling backs